Sudan–Yugoslavia relations were historical foreign relations between Sudan and now split-up Socialist Federal Republic of Yugoslavia. Both countries were founding members of the Non-aligned Movement. President of Sudan Ibrahim Abboud personally participated in the 1961 Non-Aligned Conference in Belgrade. Relations between the two countries intensified after the failed 1971 Sudanese coup d'état when Sudan looked to replace its former ties with the Soviet Union with improved relations with Yugoslavia and the Socialist Republic of Romania.

The United States embassy in Khartoum believed that Sudan's relations with Yugoslavia were its closest relations with any socialist state and that Khartoum recognized post-1948 Yugoslav independence from the Soviet Union. The Yugoslav side was interested in further development of relations with Sudan as one of the Non-Aligned newly independent states in Africa. The country perceived its links with non-Bloc countries as an opportunity to strengthen its diplomatic position during the Cold War. Yugoslavia therefore provided especially important service in supplying parts and maintaining Sudan's aging Soviet built military equipment. The country also provided radio-transmitting facilities and secondhand naval patrol craft for the use in the Red Sea. An important aspect of the Yugoslav support was focused on the navy where it provided basic assistance in the establishment of the Sudanese Navy and for over a decade provided all of its vessels and the bulk of officer and technical training.

List of bilateral state visits

Yugoslav visits to Sudan
 12-18 February 1959: Josip Broz Tito
 14–18 February 1962: Josip Broz Tito
 20–23 February 1970: Josip Broz Tito

Sudanese visits to Yugoslavia
 9–20 July 1960: Ibrahim Abboud
 July 1961: Ibrahim Abboud
 April 1973: Jaafar Nimeiry

See also
Yugoslavia and the Non-Aligned Movement
Yugoslavia and the Organisation of African Unity
Death and state funeral of Josip Broz Tito

External links
Sudan: President Tito Of Yugoslavia Arrives In Khartoum For Official Visit 1970

References

Sudan
Yugoslavia
Bosnia and Herzegovina–Sudan relations